The 2021 New Jersey General Assembly election was held on November 2, 2021. New Jersey voters elected two Assembly members in all of the state's legislative districts for a two-year term to the New Jersey General Assembly.

All 80 seats of the New Jersey General Assembly were up for election. Democrats held a 52-28 majority in the lower house prior to the election. The members of the New Jersey Legislature are chosen from 40 electoral districts. Each district elects one State Senator and two State Assembly members. New Jersey uses coterminous legislative districts for both its State Senate and General Assembly.

Ultimately, Republicans gained six seats in the chamber, reducing Democrats' majority to 46-34. They flipped both seats in the 2nd, 3rd, and 11th districts.

Incumbents not running for re-election

Democratic
Nicholas Chiaravalloti, District 31 (lost party endorsement; withdrew from primary)
Jamel Holley, District 20 (ran for State Senate)
Valerie Huttle, District 37 (ran for State Senate)
Gordon M. Johnson, District 37 (ran for State Senate)
Vince Mazzeo, District 2 (ran for State Senate)
Andrew Zwicker, District 16 (ran for State Senate)

Republican
Jon Bramnick, District 21 (ran for State Senate)
BettyLou DeCroce, District 26 (defeated in primary)
Serena DiMaso, District 13 (lost party endorsement; defeated in primary)
Ryan Peters, District 8 (retired from politics)
Jean Stanfield, District 8 (ran for State Senate)

In addition, two members who were elected in the last election in 2019 have since resigned: Nancy Pinkin (D-18th), who was elected Middlesex County Clerk and Holly Schepisi (R-39th, after previously announcing a run for State Senate).

Results

Overview

Summary of results by district

Close races 
Districts where the difference of total votes between the top-two parties was under 10%:
  gain
 
  gain
 
 
 
 
  gain

List of races

District 1

Republican primary

Democratic primary

Following the primary, Wilson withdrew from the general election on August 31. Former NJ DHS official Julia Hankerson was added to the ballot as a replacement candidate on September 8.

General election
Polling

Predictions

Results

District 2

Democratic primary

Republican primary

General election
Polling

Predictions

Results

District 3

Democratic Primary

Republican primary

General election
Predictions

Results

District 4

Republican primary

General election
Predictions

Results

District 5

Democratic primary

Republican primary

General election
Predictions

Results

District 6

Democratic primary

Republican primary

General election
Predictions

Results

District 7

Democratic primary

Republican primary

General election
Predictions

Results

District 8

Republican primary

Democratic primary

General election
Predictions

Results

District 9

Republican primary

Democratic primary

General election
Predictions

Results

District 10

Republican primary

Democratic primary

General election
Predictions

Results

District 11

Democratic primary

Republican primary

General election
Predictions

Endorsements 

Results

District 12

Republican primary

Endorsements

Democratic primary

General election
Predictions

Results

Endorsements

District 13

Republican primary

Democratic primary

General election
Predictions

Results

District 14

Democratic primary

Endorsements

Republican primary

General election
Predictions

Results

Endorsements

District 15

Democratic primary

Endorsements

Republican primary

General election
Predictions

Results

Endorsements

District 16

Democratic primary

Endorsements

Republican primary

General election
Predictions

Results

Endorsements

District 17

Democratic primary

Endorsements

Republican primary

General election
Predictions

Results

Endorsements

District 18

Democratic primary

Endorsements

Republican primary

General election
Predictions

Results

Endorsements

District 19

Democratic primary

Republican primary

General election
Predictions

Results

District 20

Democratic primary

Endorsements

Republican primary
No Republicans filed.

General election
Predictions

Results

Endorsements

District 21

Republican primary

Democratic primary

General election
Predictions

Results

District 22

Democratic primary

Republican primary

General election
Predictions

Results

District 23

Republican primary

Democratic primary

General election
Predictions

Results

District 24

Republican primary

Democratic primary

General election
Predictions

Results

District 25

Republican primary

Democratic primary

General election
Predictions

Results

District 26

Republican primary

Democratic primary

General election
Predictions

Results

District 27

Democratic primary

Endorsements

Republican primary

General election
Predictions

Results

Endorsements

District 28

Democratic primary

Republican primary

General election
Predictions

Results

District 29

Democratic primary

Republican primary
No Republicans filed.

General election
Predictions

Results

District 30

Republican primary

Democratic primary

General election
Predictions

Results

District 31

Democratic primary

Republican primary

General election
Predictions

Results

District 32

Democratic primary

Republican primary

General election
Predictions

Results

District 33

Democratic primary

Endorsements

Republican primary

General election
Predictions

Results

Endorsements

District 34

Democratic primary

Endorsements

Republican primary

General election
Predictions

Results

Endorsements

District 35

Democratic primary

Endorsements

Republican primary

General election
Predictions

Results

Endorsements

District 36

Democratic primary

Endorsements

Republican primary
No Republicans filed. However, Craig Auriemma and Joseph Viso Jr. received enough write-in votes to qualify for the general election.

General election
Predictions

Results

Endorsements

District 37

Democratic primary

Endorsements

Republican primary

General election
Predictions

Results

Endorsements

District 38

Democratic primary

Republican primary

General election
Predictions

Results

District 39

Republican primary

Democratic primary

General election
Predictions

Results

District 40

Republican primary

Democratic primary

General election
Predictions

Results

Notes

References

2021
New Jersey General Assembly
general assembly